ATP-binding cassette sub-family B member 5 also known as P-glycoprotein ABCB5 is a plasma membrane-spanning protein that in humans is encoded by the ABCB5 gene. ABCB5 is an ABC transporter and P-glycoprotein family member principally expressed in physiological skin and human malignant melanoma.

Clinical significance 

ABCB5 has been suggested to regulate skin progenitor cell fusion and mediate chemotherapeutic drug resistance in stem-like tumor cell subpopulations in human malignant melanoma, colorectal cancer, and malignant pleural mesothelioma. It is commonly over-expressed on circulating melanoma tumour cells. Furthermore, the ABCB5+ melanoma- initiating cells were demonstrated to express FLT1 (VEGFR1) receptor tyrosine kinase which was functionally required for efficient xenograft tumor formation, as demonstrated by shRNA knockdown experiments.

In colorectal cancer, ABCB5 was shown to act as a mediator of 5-FU patient chemoresistance, and had a further direct role in tumorigenesis shown by shRNA-mediated colorectal cancer cell-line ABCB5 knockdowns that impeded tumorigenesis in human-to-mouse xenografts. It has been shown that in some highly aggressive tumors, such as mesothelioma and melanoma, ABCB5 contributes to multi-drug chemotherapy resistance, and tumor growth, controlling a proinflammatory signaling circuit utilizing TLR4, IL-1β, IL8 and CXCR1 signaling involving reciprocal paracrine interactions between the cancer stem cells and tumor bulk population (in a rheostat manner termed "cancer stem cell rheostasis"). ABCB5 was shown to maintain the slow-cycling melanoma stem cells using this cytokine signaling loop, which became more differentiated upon ABCB5 interference (e.g. WFDC1 melanocyte differentiation marker increased, cancer cells were faster growing in vitro, tumors were more pigmented), or CXCR1 blockade (slow-cycling ABCB5+ cells entered the cell-cycle).

In normal physiology, ABCB5 is a functional marker for adult limbal stem cells of the cornea. ABCB5+ cells could regrow a human cornea on a mouse with limbal stem cell deficiency (LSCD - a blindness disease of the corneal limbus) while ABCB5- cells could not, indicating a therapeutic potential for treating some types of blindness. ABCB5 was further shown to be anti-apoptotic in these adult stem cells.

References

Further reading

External links 
 
  
 

Tumor markers